

Senior provincial finals

Connacht
Final

Replay

Leinster

Munster

Ulster

All Ireland Senior Semi-Finals

2017 All-Ireland Ladies' Junior Club Football Championship
Semi-Finals

2017
Club